Magnapop is the debut album by Magnapop, released in 1992 and re-released with bonus tracks on July 29, 1997.

Recording and release
Four of the tracks—"Favorite Writer", "Chemical", "Complicated", and "Merry"—were recorded in John Keane Studio, Athens, Georgia in December 1990 with Linda Hopper's friend Michael Stipe producing. (The band also recorded the song "Texas", but subsequently re-recorded it for their first proper studio album, Hot Boxing.) The rest were self-recorded through March 1992 at Furies Studio in Atlanta suburb Marietta. The album produced one single—"Merry"/"Complicated"—released as a 7" on Solid Records (catalogue number 527.9013.40); a music video for the song was created in 1992.

The song "Favorite Writer" would later be covered by R.E.M. for their 2003 single "Bad Day" and during their 2003 tour to support In Time: The Best of R.E.M. 1988–2003. On September 13, 2011, Creative Loafing announced that Mulvaney had attempted to re-form the original line-up of Magnapop to perform a benefit concert for local independent music store Criminal Records. The benefit was later scheduled for October 15, and the band announced that they would be performing their self-titled debut album in its entirety.

Two songs from this session would end up on the 2019 release The Circle Is Round.

Reception

The album received a positive review from Allmusic, with reviewer Heather Phares labeling their cover version of Big Star's "Thirteen" "a welcome addition to this good beginning." Pitchfork Media's review was more ambivalent, characterizing the album as "some impressive work for so early in their career" but hampered by minimal production and the price of a full-length album for only 25 minutes of music.

Track listing
All songs written by Linda Hopper and Ruthie Morris, except where noted.
Side one
"Garden" – 2:21
"Guess" – 2:53
"Ear" (Ernest Noyes Brookings, Linda Hopper, and Ruthie Morris) – 2:21
"13" (Chris Bell and Alex Chilton of Big Star) – 2:42
"Spill It" – 2:48

Side two
"Chemical" – 3:31
"Favorite Writer" – 2:56
"Complicated" – 1:52
"Merry" – 3:04

Re-release bonus tracks
"Snake" (Demo) (Hopper, Morris, Shannon Mulvaney) – 5:45
"Skinburns" (Demo) – 4:03

Personnel
Magnapop
Linda Hopper – lead vocals
David McNair – drums
Ruthie Morris – guitar, backing vocals
Shannon Mulvaney – bass guitar, backing vocals

Technical staff
Ed Burdell – engineering on "Garden", "Guess", "Ear", "13", and "Spill It"
Magnapop – production on "Garden", "Guess", "Ear", "13", "Spill It", "Snake", and "Skinburns"
Michael Stipe – production on "Chemical", "Favorite Writer", "Complicated", and "Merry"

Release history
The album was initially released on Caroline Records in the United States and Play It Again Sam/Priority Records in the United Kingdom, with later editions published by Solid (The Netherlands) and King (Japan); the re-release with bonus tracks was published in the United States by Never.

†Re-release with bonus tracks

References

External links
Official site

 (re-release)

 (re-release)
Magnapop at Discogs

1992 albums
Albums produced by Michael Stipe
Caroline Records albums
Demo albums
King Records (Japan) albums
Magnapop albums
PIAS Recordings albums
Priority Records albums